= Number of colors =

Number of colors may refer to:

- Hex triplet, hexadecimal address of a color.
- Color depth, bit representation of number of displayable colors.
